Qeshlaq Chay (also Romanized as Qeshlāq Chāy) is a village in Gerdeh Rural District, in the Central District of Namin County, Ardabil Province, Iran. At the 2006 census, its population was 264, in 70 families.

References 

Towns and villages in Namin County